Meadow Brook is a stream in Knox County in the U.S. state of Missouri.

Meadow Brook was descriptively named.

See also
List of rivers of Missouri

References

Rivers of Knox County, Missouri
Rivers of Missouri